An Elephant Sitting Still is a 2018 Chinese drama film written, directed, and edited by Hu Bo. The first and only feature film by the novelist-turned-director Hu, who died by suicide soon after finishing his film on 12 October 2017 at the age of 29, it is based on a story with the same title from his 2017 novel Huge Crack, about four people who travel to a northern Chinese city to see the eponymous elephant. It made its world premiere in the Forum section of the 68th Berlin International Film Festival. The film has won acclaim from established directors such as Béla Tarr, Wang Bing, Ang Lee, and Gus Van Sant.

The film opened the 12th FIRST International Film Festival in Xining in late July 2018.  It was released in the United Kingdom on December 14, 2018, and in the United States on March 8, 2019. Critics' reviews were highly positive.

Plot
In Shijiazhuang, gang member Yu Cheng monologues with a woman in his bed about a sitting elephant in a circus in Manzhouli who could be thrashed and beaten but remains still. A man later argues with her; he is Cheng's close friend and she his wife. The friend later kills himself off-screen. Later, Cheng meets his girlfriend, who rejected his sexual advances, and blames for the suicide. He tells her he plans to see the elephant in Manzhouli.

Simultaneously, Wei Bu wakes up to his father chastising him about his filthy room. As he leaves for school, he watches old man Wang Jin leave with his pet dog. He leaves for school to meet his friend Li Kai and discuss how they will face the school bully Yu Shuai as Li was accused of stealing his cell phone. Eventually they meet Shuai, who tells them to meet his gang at the stairway after school. Wei sees the school's vice-dean, who tells him the school will eventually close down and he will move to another, better school while Wei the students will go to a worse school and have no future. Wei briefly meets his neighbor and friend Huang Ling. Later that day, he and Li face up to Shuai, who mocks Wei's father for getting fired because of accepting bribes. Wei pushes Shuai and he falls down a flight of stairs. When Wei returns home to his father, he realizes he is not safe at home.

In the morning, Huang complains about a bathroom leakage; her mother does not care. In the afternoon she meets Wei who says he plans to leave to Manzhouli to see the elephant. He invites her to live with him on the run but she mocks him for his lack of planning and quips that his only skill is kicking around a shuttlecock. Later, Wei follows Huang to a bakery where he discovers her with the vice-dean. Cheng also happens to be there and tells him that he is looking for a boy who injured his little brother. Wei does not reveal his identity and leaves after writing a note threatening the vice-dean. Later, Huang and the vice-dean go to a hotel room, where she finds out that one of their intercourses was filmed and the video spread online. Huang goes home and tells her mother about it. Later, the vice-dean and his wife intrude and Huang escapes through the window, returning for a baseball bat with which she whacks the vice-dean and his wife.

Wang lives with his granddaughter, son, and daughter-in-law. His son pleads him to leave the apartment (which Wang owns) for a nursing home as he and his wife cannot afford to take care of them both. Wang mulls it over and leaves with his dog. Later, while walking, he sees a lady looking for her dog Pipi. Wang later meets Pipi in an alleyway; Pipi fatally attacks Wang's dog and runs away. He later goes to the woman's apartment. He meets a man and his wife and tells them about the incident. The man is upset about the accusations and becomes deranged. When Wang later buries his dog, Wei sees him and asks him for money. Wei, in return, gives him his pool cue, which he reclaimed from a store where Cheng and his gang stayed. The deranged man drives near them and accuses Wang of possibly killing Pipi because it has still not returned. Wei threatens him and gets beaten up. The man drives off without finding out anything. Wang returns to his apartment building, encountering Cheng and his gang. They notice the cue and question him; Wang escapes and beats up Cheng's goons. He reenters his apartment, his son wanting to call the authorities. However, Wang, a retired soldier, decides to go out with his cue and face the men who disappeared.

At dusk, Wei goes to the hospital where Shuai is hospitalized, sees Yu again, and runs away. He tells Li to meet him at a mall and angrily chokes him for he reveals that he did steal Shuai's phone because it had a video of Li urinating and the vice-dean with Huang. Wei decides to purchase tickets from a scalper to go to Manzhouli to hide but is deceived. The scalper leads him to a rooftop where the supposed money to be refunded is kept. They meet his friend and goons, who are revealed to be gangsters. They beat up Wei and call up Cheng. Cheng arrives and discovers Wei was responsible for fatally injuring Shuai. However, Cheng does not care about Shuai and asks Wei where he plans to run off to. Surprised to hear he also wants to go to Manzhouli, Cheng decides to help Wei by telling his men to purchase tickets but tells Wei that someone will arrest Wei sooner or later. Suddenly, Li appears with his gun and tells Wei to run. The men attack Li, who accidentally shoots Yu non-fatally. Li claims he is proud of himself and tells Wei he never posted the video of Huang and the vice-dean but Wei is disgusted and leaves him be. Yu then watches Li fatally shoot himself.

At evening, Wei buys tickets at the train station. He meets Wang, who decided to take his granddaughter to see the same elephant show, and Huang, who decides to leave the city. Huang reveals that the tickets were canceled so they take a bus to Shenyang en route to Manzhouli. They exit the bus near Manzhouli at dark. As Wei kicks a shuttlecock with others, an elephant roar is heard.

Cast
Peng Yuchang as Wei Bu
Zhang Yu as Yu Cheng
Wang Yuwen as Huang Ling
Liu Congxi as Wang Jin
Xiang Rongdong as Deputy dean
Jing Guo as Deputy dean's wife
Guozhang Zhaoyan as Wei Bu's father
Li Suyun as Wei Bu's mother
Kong Wei as Wang Jin's son-in-law
Li Danyi as Wang Jin's daughter
Kong Yixin as Wang Jin's granddaughter
Ling Zhenghui as Li Kai
Zhang Xiaolong as Yu Shuai
Wang Ning as Huang Ling's mother

Production

Filming 
The film is set in the northern Chinese industrial city of Shijiazhuang in the Hebei province. Filming occurred in Shijiazhuang over the course of twenty-five days in March and April 2017. Fan Chao, the film's cinematographer, shot with a handheld camera and frequently used tracking shots. This was a result of low budget: Hu originally intended to film statically and with wide angles, but it was too expensive.

Hu Bo wrote, directed, and edited the film himself. Production began in 2016 when he took his screenplay to FIRST Film Festival in Xining for financing. The screenplay was noticed by producer Liu Xuan, who then took it to her husband Wang Xiaoshuai. He ended up producing the film. Reportedly, Hu struggled at this time with maintaining creative control over the project, as well as making enough money from it to be able to live. He described the experience as "humiliation, despair and powerlessness" online, and was berated by Wang who also posted that the film was a "mess." His relationship began deteriorating with Wang because of this.

The final straw came when Wang attempted to convince Hu to cut his film down from 230 minutes to 120 minutes. Those close to Hu reported that this pressure was a major reason Hu committed suicide after production of the film was over. Wang Xiaoshuai's name was scrubbed from the press kit credits, but his production company remained attached.

Distribution 
The film was first screened on 16 February 2018 at the 68th Berlin International Film Festival in the Forum section. He was one of three young Chinese directors that were able to make it in thanks to their higher-profile Chinese producers, part of a growing trend in representation for independent films at Berlinale. In light of Hu's suicide, the Q&A section of the premiere was replaced by speeches from Hu's mother and his film school teacher Wang Hongwei. The 230 minute cut was chosen for this release and the subsequent ones worldwide. The film was then shown at the 42nd Hong Kong International Film Festival, where it won the Audience Choice Award. It ran through festivals until widely released in the United Kingdom on 14 December 2018 and in the United States on 8 March 2019.

On 18 November 2019, the film received its streaming premiere on the Criterion Channel. On 10 December 2019, the film released on Blu-ray.

Reception

Critical reception
An emotional Béla Tarr, when presenting the film to an international audience, said that he felt he had done too little to prevent the suicide of his protégé, that the great film will be remembered forever, and that people should look after individuals like Hu. An Elephant Sitting Still was acclaimed by critics. On Rotten Tomatoes, the film has an approval rating of 94%, with an average rating of 8.40/10, based on 52 critics, the critic consensus says "A remarkable debut that sadly serves as its creator's epitaph, An Elephant Sitting Still offers an uncompromisingly grim yet poignant portrait of life in modern China." On Metacritic, the film has a score (using a weighted average) of 86 out of 100, indicating "universal acclaim". Justin Chang of the Los Angeles Times wrote that although the film has "a soap opera season's worth of romantic indiscretions, sudden deaths, unfortunate accidents, provoked and unprovoked attacks", the story "somehow never loses its sense of balance and modulation." Chang argued that the work had a consoling insight that the characters are all worth knowing despite their flaws, and lauded it as "a triumph of bold sociopolitical critique and intimate human portraiture, and a reminder that you rarely encounter the one without the other."

David Ehrlich, who assigned the film an "A−" rating in IndieWire, argued that An Elephant Sitting Still "has little interest in the conventional drama of cause and effect, and its fractured structure is used to emphasize the distance between these people rather than the ties that bind them together." He characterized it as a searching film that avoids "[contriving] an empty solution for the demoralized". Justine Smith, who awarded the film 3.5/4 stars, praised the film's portrayal of love in a system of inequality and oppression. She argued that Hu simultaneously suggests that love in a devastated system "means tethering yourself to people who have long been broken by mistreatment and inequality and who no longer have the capacity to return it", but also that love and beauty are "a constant source of minute, if not fleeting, pleasure." Smith referred to this as a "realistic" portrayal of love in such a system and billed the film's ending as "one of the greatest in contemporary film history", though also referred to the film as "overwhelmingly grey".

In The New Yorker, Richard Brody lauded An Elephant Sitting Still as one of the greatest recent films, writing that Hu "builds an intricate grid of conflict-riddled connections among the movie's main characters" and that the "volatile, roving long takes pursue the characters to the deepest corners of their explosive despair". Brody argued that Hu's "vision conveys a mighty, universal human despair." Matthew Thrift of Little White Lies praised the film as "without question one of the strongest debuts in recent memory", arguing that "the remarkable surety of Hu's direction provides a restless momentum. It's a film constantly in motion, tracking cat and mouse alike through the city streets. [...] Conflict is borne out of character and circumstance, rather than narrative contrivance or traditional dramatic structure."

Best lists
An Elephant Sitting Still has been ranked by numerous critics and publications as one of the best films of 2018/2019.

 1st – Cinema Scope
 2nd – Lawrence Garcia, The A.V. Club
 3rd – K. Austin Collins, Vanity Fair
 6th – Philip Concannon, Gay City News
 6th – Jordan Cronk
 9th – Nick Linden, The Hollywood Reporter
 9th – David Hudson
 9th – Hyperallergic
 Top 9 (unranked)–  The Quietus
 10th – Dennis Dermody, Paper
 Top 10 (unranked)–  Sheila O'Mailey, RogerEbert.com
 12th – Justin Chang, The Los Angeles Times
 12th – Fernando F. Croce, CinePassion
 13th – Slant
 13th – Film Comment
 13th – Charles Bramesco, The A.V. Club
 14th – Nick Schager, Esquire
 Top 20 (outside top 10, 11-20 unranked)–  Ed Gonzalez, Slant
 24th – Michael Glover Smith, White City Cinema
 25th – Slant
 Top 26 (outside top 10, 11-26 unranked)–  A.O. Scott, The New York Times
 32nd – Film Stage
 Top 46 (unranked)–  Richard Brody, The New Yorker. Brody also ranked it as one of the 27 best movies of the 2010s.

They Shoot Pictures, Don't They? determines An Elephant Sitting Still as the 518th most critically acclaimed film of the 21st century.

Awards and nominations

References

External links 
Official website - United States 

2018 films
2018 drama films
Chinese drama films
Films set in Hebei
Films based on Chinese novels